Ana María González (born July 9, 1974) is a retired female Olympic backstroke swimmer from Cuba. She swam for Cuba at the:
2000 Olympics
1999 Pan American Games
1998 Central American & Caribbean Games
1993 Central American & Caribbean Games

References

External links

1976 births
Living people
Cuban female swimmers
Swimmers at the 2000 Summer Olympics
Swimmers at the 1999 Pan American Games
Olympic swimmers of Cuba
Female backstroke swimmers
Central American and Caribbean Games gold medalists for Cuba
Central American and Caribbean Games medalists in swimming
Competitors at the 1993 Central American and Caribbean Games
Competitors at the 1998 Central American and Caribbean Games
Pan American Games competitors for Cuba
20th-century Cuban women
20th-century Cuban people